This is a list of speakers of the House of Representatives of Jamaica. Speaker is the presiding officer of House of Representatives of Jamaica. Annual salary of the speaker is $JMD 5,500,000.

Below is a list of office-holders, starting from 1945:

References
 People's National Party

Main
Speakers of the House of Representatives